Pedro Soto is the name of:

Pedro Soto (footballer), Mexican footballer
Pedro Soto (politician), Spanish politician

See also
Pedro Blanco Soto, Bolivian general and politician